The Norwegian Men's Volleyball League is a men's volleyball competition which has existed since 1973. It is organized by the Norwegian Volleyball Federation (Norges Volleyballforbund, NVBF).

History
In the 2018/19 Edition in the Eliteseriya 8 teams has participated: "Call (Oslo), TIF-Wiking (Bergen), Förde, Randaberg, Tromsø, Ashim, Stod (Steinhier), Toppe Valley Norge (Sunnes). The championship title was won by Förde, who won the final series beating Randaberg 2-0 (3:0, 3:0). The 3rd place went to TIF Viking.

Winners list

References

External links
Norwegian Volleyball Federation 

Norway
Volleyball in Norway
Sports leagues established in 1973
1973 establishments in Norway
Professional sports leagues in Norway